Tasiujaq (Inuktitut syllabics: ᑕᓯᐅᔭᖅ) formerly Murray Maxwell Bay  is an uninhabited waterway in the Qikiqtaaluk Region, Nunavut, Canada. It is located in the Foxe Basin, north of Baffin Island's Siorarsuk Peninsula. Kapuiviit lies at the opening of the bay.

Before the bay was fully explored, it was named "Murray Maxwell Inlet", in honour of Captain Sir Murray Maxwell, by Lieutenant Henry Parkyns Hoppner who observed the waterway while sailing with Sir William Edward Parry on his second Arctic voyage of 1821.

Fauna
The area is frequented by bowhead whales.

References

Bays of Foxe Basin